Louis XIV was an  118-gun ship of the line of the French Navy.

Laid down as Tonnant in 1811 at Rochefort, she was renamed Louis-XIV in 1828, still on keel. She was launched only in 1854, and was put in the reserve the next year.

On 28 January 1855, she departed Toulon to take part in the Siege of Sevastopol as a transport ship. From September 1856 to 1857, she was converted to combined sail/steam propulsion in Brest harbour, using machinery supplied by Robert Napier of Glasgow, to reenter service on 25 October 1857.

Louis XIV was decommissioned between 1858 and 1861, and was affected to the École Navale as a gunnery training ship from 1861 to 1865. That year, she was sent to Toulon. In 1870, her crew was sent to Paris to defend the city against the advancing Prussian armies. Training resumed in November 1870.

In 1873, Louis XIV was decommissioned again. She was struck on 3 May 1880, and sold for scrap in 1882.

Bibliography

External links
 
 110/130-gun ships-of-the-line, including a photograph

Ships of the line of the French Navy
Océan-class ships of the line
1854 ships
Ships built in France